The 1903 Goldey College football team represented Goldey College (now known as Goldey–Beacom College) in the 1903 college football season as an independent. They compiled a record of 0–1–1.

Schedule

References

Goldey College
Goldey College football seasons
Goldey College football
College football winless seasons